Leccinum atrostipitatum, also known as the dark-stalked bolete is a species of edible mushroom in the genus Leccinum.

Description
Leccinum atrostipitatum caps are 7–20 cm across, convex, dry, minutely hairy to fibril-streaked, and buff to yellow-orange or ochre. Flesh is white, staining grey, then black. Tubes are grey-brown, staining as flesh. Pores are small, round and smokey to blackish-brown. Stalks are up to 20 cm tall by 3.5 cm wide, whitish, and with many raised, black dots. Spore print is yellow-brown to olive. Dark-Stalked Bolete fruits on the ground in mixed woods.

Leccinum is a genus of fungi in the family Boletaceae. It was the name given first to a series of fungi within the genus Boletus, then erected as a new genus last century. Their main distinguishing feature is the small, rigid projections (scabers) that give a rough texture to their stalks. The genus name was coined from the Italian Leccino, for a type of rough-stemmed bolete. The genus has a widespread distribution, especially in north temperate regions, and contains about 75 species.

Ecology and habitat

Dark-Stalked Boletes fruit on the ground in mixed woods.

"Leccinum species are generally found in the woodlands of Europe, Asia, and North America, forming ectomycorrhizal associations with  trees.  Most Leccinum species are mycorrhizal specialists, associating with trees of a single genus.  Leccinum aurantiacum is an exception, however, occurring in mycorrhizal association with poplar, birch, and oak.

EdibilityLeccinum atrostipitatum is a very good edible mushroom,
as are Leccinum species in general for the most part. However, there are reports of gastric upset after consuming unidentified members of the genus in North America, even after thorough cooking.  Certain species, such as L. insigne, are suspected (but not confirmed) to cause gastric upset after consumption.  Most species of Leccinum often cause nausea when consumed raw, therefore insufficient cooking or inconsistent heating needs to be acknowledged as a consideration in these cases. 

The key to safe and successful cooking Leccinum'' species like this is preparation. A dry-saute is best. Clean and slice the mushrooms, then put them in a skillet on maximum  heat with no butter or oil. sprinkle them with salt (to help draw out the moisture). Stir constantly until they begin to give off liquid, then let them cook in their own juices. After the liquid has evaporated (you can pour off some of it for use as stock), continue to cook them for a couple of minutes, stirring constantly again so they do not stick. Then turn down the heat, add a little olive oil or butter, and cook for another 5–10 minutes. They should be fairly chewy and full of flavor, not slimy, You can eat them as they are or incorporate them into any dish.

References

atrostipitatum
Edible fungi